Penicillium miczynskii is a species of the genus Penicillium which was isolated from soil under conifers in Poland. Penicillium miczynskii produces citreoviridin.

References

Further reading 
 
 
 
 

miczynskii
Fungi described in 1927